The Canadian Dental Association (CDA; French: Association dentaire canadienne) is a non-profit professional association representing Canada's 18,000 dentists. Headquartered in Canada's capital city Ottawa, the CDA serves its members and the public by managing key oral health issues on their behalf and by coordinating dental health awareness programs across the nation.

CDA is actively involved with lobbying and advocacy initiatives and uses its leadership role to communicate to the public and the government the profession's concerns regarding managed dental care.

History
The CDA was founded in 1902.

Deborah Stymiest of Fredericton was elected as its first female president in 2008.

CDA Seal Program

The CDA Seal is a symbol to help consumers know which oral health benefit claims made by a manufacturer have been independently reviewed and are supported by scientific evidence. The seal is designed to help the public and dental professionals make informed choices. It is based on the dental symbol, the Rod of Asclepius surrounded by an interlocking circle and triangle.

CDA Corporate Membership
The Canadian Dental Association is a nationwide professional organization, representing Canadian dentists through its corporate members, who are currently:
Association of Dental Surgeons of British Columbia
Alberta Dental Association and College
College of Dental Surgeons of Saskatchewan
Manitoba Dental Association
Ontario Dental Association
New Brunswick Dental Society
Northwest Territories and Nunavut
Nova Scotia Dental Association
Dental Association of Prince Edward Island
Newfoundland & Labrador Dental Association
Yukon Dental Association

Corporate members are provincial or territorial dental organizations that pay a corporate membership fee in order to represent their members' interests on a national basis.

Publications
Journal of the Canadian Dental Association
CDA Essentials

References

External links
 

1902 establishments in Ontario
Dental organizations based in Canada